The Elbow Creek Wind Project was a 122 megawatt (MW) wind farm beginning in 2008 in Howard County near Big Spring, Texas. The project used 53 Siemens 2.3 MW wind turbine generators, which provide enough electricity for nearly 100,000 households. It was repowered in 2019.

References

Energy infrastructure completed in 2008
Wind farms in Texas
Buildings and structures in Howard County, Texas
NRG Energy